Bonnie S. Glaser is the director of the Asia Program at the German Marshall Fund of the United States. She was previously a senior adviser for Asia and the director of the China Power Project at the Center for Strategic and International Studies. Glaser is also a non-resident fellow with the Lowy Institute in Sydney, a senior associate with CSIS Pacific Forum, and a consultant for the U.S. government on East Asia. Glaser writes extensively on various aspects of Chinese foreign policy, including Sino-American relations, U.S.-China military ties, Cross-Strait relations, China’s relations with Japan and Korea, Chinese perspectives on missile defense, and multilateral security in Asia.

Education

Glaser received her B.A. in political science from Boston University and her M.A. with concentrations in international economics and Chinese studies from the Johns Hopkins School of Advanced International Studies.

Career

Glaser began her career as a consultant for various U.S. government agencies, including the Department of Defense and Department of State. In 1997 she served as a member of the Defense Department’s Defense Policy Board China Panel.

Glaser joined CSIS in 2003 as a senior associate in the International Security Program. Since 2008 Glaser has focused on issues related to Chinese foreign and security policy at CSIS, beginning as a Senior Adviser with the Freeman Chair in China Studies.
 
In addition to her research, Glaser serves as a key interlocutor for experts and officials speaking at CSIS events. In 2015 Glaser shared the stage with the Chinese Ambassador to Washington, Cui Tiankai, as he delivered China's perspective following the Permanent Court of Arbitration's verdict on China's claims to the South China Sea.

China Power Project

In 2016 Glaser launched a new CSIS initiative, the China Power Project. The Glaser-directed initiative seeks to fill a void in the public's understanding of China's power and capabilities by analyzing "key developments in the country’s military, economic, technological, social and diplomatic rise" in interactive and visually friendly forms.

A key impetus for the project is shedding light on the competition between China and the United States:

Glaser said she was constantly asked the question of whether China would become a superpower to rival the US. "It really can only be understood when you break it down to the components of power," she explained. "Where is China narrowing the gap or does it even have the edge, and where it is lagging behind?"

Glaser's China Power Project microsite focuses on using data and expert analysis to bring greater clarity and understanding to these questions.

Glaser left CSIS and the China Power Project in 2021.

References

Living people
People from New York City
Boston University College of Arts and Sciences alumni
Paul H. Nitze School of Advanced International Studies alumni
Year of birth missing (living people)
CSIS people
American podcasters